The prehispanic history of Chile refers to the period from the first human populations in the territory of Chile until the first European exploration of the region, by Spaniard Diego de Almagro in 1535-36.

There are numerous theories on the settlement of the Americas; the most accepted currently, that of Paul Rivet, states that there were numerous arrivals for different reasons: those leaving Asia via the Bering Straits, but also those traveling from island to island in Polynesia and Melanesia, via Central America.  The first people to arrive in the territory of Chile would have been in one of these population movements.

The prehistoric site of Monte Verde in Chile, presently under consideration as a World Heritage Site by UNESCO,  has provided the oldest dates of habitations in Chile at around 13,000 to 15,000 years for "Monte Verde II."  Dates of 33,000 to 35,000 years have been suggested for the "Monte Verde I" site but the evidence is considered too meagre to verify that. 

Various research suggests the first populations arrived to the country around  BC, during the Pleistocene period for the prehistoric site at "Monte Verde I" and around  years BC for the site at "Monte Verde II" (the end of the Pleistocene and start of the Holocene (close to the end of the Upper Paleolithic).  Prehispanic Chile was peopled by diverse Amerindian people who were located around the Andes and the coast. In the area to the north of the country, the Aymara and the Atacama began to cultivate land from the 11th century in the style of the Incas (growing plants on terraces on the sides of mountains with canal systems).   By the 15th century, the Incas had taken possession of the territory of modern-day Chile up to the Maule River.  At the south of the Aconcagua, the semi-nomadic communities such as the Mapuche were set up.  In the austral zone of the country, various Amerindian people such as the Chomos, Tamanas, Alacalufes and Onas were living. In the Easter Islands a Polynesian culture developed, which continues today.

On the Pacific coast, different cultures and peoples coexisted: the Aymara, Chango, Chinchorro, Atacama, Diaguita in the north: the Picunche, Mapuche, Huilliche, Chono in the Central and Southern region; and the Ona, Yaghan and Alakaluf in Patagonia and Tierra del Fuego. The Mapuche formed a numerous community.

The Chinchorro 
The Chinchorro culture of South America goes back to 9,000 years ago. These were sedentary fishing people of the northern Chile and southern Peru. They inhabited the arid coastal regions of the Atacama Desert from Ilo, southern Peru, to Antofagasta in northern Chile. Outcrops of fresh water on the coast facilitated human settlement in this region. The Chinchorro are famous for their detailed mummification practice (Chinchorro mummies). The culture lasted for several thousand years, evolving and adapting over the period.

The Chinchorro were expert fishermen. They developed an extensive and sophisticated fishing tool assemblage. They had efficient fishing gear, such as fishing hooks made of shells and cacti, and stone weights for nets made of mesh fabrics. They became skilled weavers of baskets and mats.

The Chinchorro type site is located in Arica, Chile; it was discovered by Max Uhle in the early 20th century.

Their mummies which were much more ancient than those of the ancient Egyptians. Some of their DNA was recovered.

See also
 Origin of the Mapuche
 Mapuche history
 Incas in Central Chile

Notes

External links 
Chinchorro Archaeological site in Chile
"Making the Dead Beautiful: Mummies as Art" Archaeology Magazine

Prehistory of Chile